Steele Township may refer to one of the following places:

In Canada

Steele Township, Cochrane District, Ontario (historical)

In the United States

Steele Township, Conway County, Arkansas
Steele Township, Daviess County, Indiana
Steele Township, Rowan County, North Carolina

See also

Steele (disambiguation)

Township name disambiguation pages